Osvaldo Hernández Chambell (born 11 July 1970  in Camagüey) is  an Italian volleyball player originally from Cuba.

Son:Osvaldo Lázaro Hernández Suárez

In Italy, he won the scudetto (top division title) in 2000 with Piaggio Roma. With Cuba national team, he won a World League in 1998. He has played for Cuba in the Olympic Games from 1992 to 2000.

Individual awards
 1995 FIVB Volleyball World League"Best Blocker-Intercontinental Round"
 1998 FIVB Volleyball World League"Best Scorer"
 1998 FIVB Volleyball World League"Best Spiker"
 1998 FIVB Volleyball World League"Most Valuable Player"
 1999 FIVB Volleyball World Cup"Best Server"
 1999 Italian League "Best Spiker"
 2000 Italian League "Best Server"
 2000 Men's Olympic Volleyball"Best Server"

External links
Page at Italy's Volleyball League website 

1970 births
Living people
Sportspeople from Camagüey
Cuban emigrants to Italy
Cuban men's volleyball players
Italian men's volleyball players
Olympiacos S.C. players
Volleyball players at the 1992 Summer Olympics
Volleyball players at the 1996 Summer Olympics
Volleyball players at the 2000 Summer Olympics
Olympic volleyball players of Cuba
Pan American Games medalists in volleyball
Pan American Games gold medalists for Cuba
Pan American Games bronze medalists for Cuba
Medalists at the 1995 Pan American Games
Medalists at the 1999 Pan American Games